John Cochrane may refer to:

Sir John Cochrane (Royalist) (died 1650), Scottish diplomat and soldier
Sir John Cochrane of Ochiltree (died 1695), Scottish soldier implicated in Monmouth's conspiracy and the Rye House plot
John Cochrane (merchant) (1750–1801), merchant and author from a Scottish aristocratic family
John Dundas Cochrane (1780–1825), British Royal Navy officer and explorer, cousin of Admiral Thomas Cochrane, 10th Earl of Dundonald
John George Cochrane (1781–1852), Scottish bibliographer
John Cochrane (chess player) (1798–1878), Scottish chess player
John Cochrane (politician) (1813–1898), Congressman, American Civil War Union general and New York State Attorney General, 1864–1865
John C. Cochrane (1835–1887), American architect
John M. Cochrane (1859–1904), Justice of the North Dakota Supreme Court
Johnny Cochrane, Scottish football manager
John Cochrane (pilot) (1930–2006), British aviator
John H. Cochrane (born 1957), American financial economist at the University of Chicago Booth School of Business
John Cochrane and Brothers, Scottish sculptors

See also
John Cochran (disambiguation)